HMAS Kookaburra (A331) was a Net-class boom defence vessel of the Royal Australian Navy (RAN), which served during World War II.

Construction
Kookaburra was one of three ships ordered by the Royal Australian Navy for use as boom-net defence vessels. She was laid down by the Cockatoo Docks & Engineering Company at Cockatoo Island Dockyard in Sydney on 4 April 1938, launched on 29 October 1938, and commissioned into the RAN on 28 February 1939.

Operational history
Originally used as boom defence ship and anti-submarine training vessel in Sydney, Kookaburra was transferred to Darwin in April 1940. The ship served as a boom defense and examination vessel in Darwin, and remained there until the end of World War II, with the exception of a refit in Brisbane between September 1942 and February 1943. Kookaburra received the battle honour "Darwin 1942-43" for her wartime service.

On 15 January 1946, Kookaburra was paid off into reserve, was briefly recommissioned for a voyage to Sydney in 1950, and underwent conversion to a "Special Duties Vessel". Kookaburra was recommissioned again on 11 May 1956 as a survey and general duties ship.

In July 1952, the ship visited Brisbane. During this visit, a paperboy delivering to the ship fell overboard and was rescued by two personnel from Kookaburra.

Decommissioning and fate
Kookaburra was decommissioned for the final time on 3 December 1958. She was marked for disposal on 24 June 1965, sold in August 1965, and scuttled in March 1970.

References

Survey ships of the Royal Australian Navy
1938 ships
Scuttled vessels of New South Wales
Boom defence vessels of the Royal Australian Navy